Bialva (also Romanized as Bīālvā and Bīālvā’) is a village in Jirdeh Rural District, in the Central District of Shaft County, Gilan Province, Iran. At the 2006 census, its population was 393, in 90 families.

References 

Populated places in Shaft County